"Kamen/Mirai Kōkai" is Tackey & Tsubasa's fifth single under the Avex Trax label.

Overview
The first a-side song "Kamen" was used as the theme song for the Japanese version of the movie Mask 2. The other a-side song "Mirai Kōkai" was used as the ending theme song for the anime One Piece.

Sample of Kamen's translated lyrics:
I'll be a flower of the summer flames
Putting on a golden, golden mask
Taking in the sun straightforwardly
With dazzling eyes, dazzling eyes, and passion that stabs the sky
Someday, I'll be the sky
So that I can bluely, bluely dissolve
If I continue to believe in a new world, in my heart, in my heart
The lies, sadness, and clouds will clear away

Track listing

Regular CD Format
 "" (Hideyuki Obata, Mikio Sakai) - 5:06
 "" (Kousuke Morimoto, Mikiko Tagata) - 4:02
 "Romantic" (Takeshi, Takashi Iioka) - 4:05
 "Kamen: karaoke" - 5:06
 "Mirai Kōkai: karaoke" - 4:03

Limited CD Format
 "" (Hideyuki Obata, Mikio Sakai) - 5:06
 "" (Kousuke Morimoto, Mikiko Tagata) - 4:02
 "Kamen: karaoke" - 5:06
 "Mirai Kōkai: karaoke" - 4:03

CD+DVD Format

CD Portion
 "" (Hideyuki Obata, Mikio Sakai) - 5:06
 "" (Kousuke Morimoto, Mikiko Tagata) - 4:02
 "Kamen: karaoke" - 5:06
 "Mirai Kōkai: karaoke" - 4:03

DVD Portion
 " Video Clip" - 5:07

Personnel
 Takizawa Hideaki - vocals
 Imai Tsubasa - vocals

TV performances
May 6, 2005 - Music Station

Charts
Oricon Sales Chart (Japan)

RIAJ Certification
As of June 2005, "Kamen / Mirai Kōkai" has been certified gold for shipments of over 100,000 by the Recording Industry Association of Japan.

References 
 Translated Lyrics
 

2005 singles
Tackey & Tsubasa songs
Oricon Weekly number-one singles